Luteolin is a flavone, a type of flavonoid, with a yellow crystalline appearance.

Luteolin is the principal yellow dye compound that is obtained from the plant Reseda luteola, which has been used as a source of the dye since at least the first millennium B.C.  Luteolin was first isolated in pure form, and named, in 1829 by the French chemist Michel Eugène Chevreul.  The luteolin empirical formula was determined by the Austrian chemists Heinrich Hlasiwetz and Leopold Pfaundler in 1864.  In 1896, the English chemist Arthur George Perkin proposed the correct structure for luteolin.  Perkin's proposed structure for luteolin was confirmed in 1900 when the Polish-Swiss chemist Stanislaw Kostanecki (1860–1910) and his students A. Różycki and J. Tambor synthesized luteolin.

Natural occurrences 
Luteolin is most often found in leaves, but it is also seen in rinds, barks, clover blossom, and ragweed pollen. It has also been isolated from the aromatic flowering plant, Salvia tomentosa in the mint family,  Lamiaceae.

Dietary sources include celery, broccoli, artichoke, green pepper, parsley, thyme, dandelion, perilla, chamomile tea, carrots, olive oil, peppermint, rosemary, navel oranges, and oregano.  It can also be found in the seeds of the palm Aiphanes aculeata.

References

External links

Flavones
PDE4 inhibitors
Flavonoid antioxidants
GABAA receptor positive allosteric modulators
3-Hydroxypropenals
Catechols
Resorcinols